is a special ward located in Tokyo Metropolis, Japan. The ward refers to itself as Kōtō City in English. As of May 1, 2015, the ward has an estimated population of 488,632, and a population density of 12,170 persons per km². The total area is approximately 40.16 km².

Kōtō is located east of the Tokyo metropolitan center, bounded by the Sumida River to the west and the Arakawa River to the east. Its major districts include Kameido, Kiba, Kiyosumi, Monzen-nakachō, Shirakawa, and Toyosu. The waterfront area of Ariake is in Kōtō, as is part of Odaiba.

Etymology 
"Kōtō" (江東) means "East [of the] River" in Japanese. The tō (東) in Kōtō means "East" and is the same character as the Tō in Tokyo (東京).

Geography 
Kōtō occupies a position on the waterfront of Tokyo Bay sandwiched between the wards of Chūō and Edogawa. To the North, its inland boundary is with the Sumida special ward. Much of the land is reclaimed, The northern part is old reclaimed land, and the elevation is very low（below sea level. The southern part is relatively new, but there are few old temples or shrines.

Noteworthy places in Kōtō include:
 In the former ward of Fukagawa: Kiba, Fukagawa, Edagawa;
 In the former ward of Jōtō: Kameido, Ōjima, Sunamachi;
 On recently reclaimed land: Ariake, Yumenoshima, Tokyo Rinkai Fukutoshin.

History 
The western part of the ward was formerly part of Fukagawa Ward of Tokyo City. It suffered severe damage in the 1923 Great Kantō earthquake, and was heavily bombed during World War II. The special ward was founded on March 15, 1947, by the merger of the wards of Fukagawa and Jōtō.

Districts
There are 45 districts in Koto:

Fukagawa Area
 Aomi
 Ariake
 Botan
 Eitai
 Edagawa
 Echujima
 Fukagawa
 Fukuzumi
 Furuishiba

 Fuyuki
 Hirano
 Ishijima
 Kiba
 Kiyosumi
 Miyoshi
 Mori
 Morishita
 Monzennakacho

 Ogibashi
 Saga
 Sarue
 Sengoku
 Shiohama
 Shiomi
 Shinonome
 Shirakawa
 Shinoohashi

 Sumiyoshi
 Senda
 Takabashi 
 Tatsumi
 Toyo
 Tokiwa
 Tomioka
 Toyosu
 Umibe

Jōtō Area
 Higashisuna
 Kameido
 Kitasuna
 Minamisuna
 Ojima
 Shinsuna
 Shin-Kiba
 Wakasu
 Yumenoshima

Transportation

Rail 
 JR East
 Chūō-Sōbu Line: Kameido Station
 Keiyō Line: Etchūjima Station, Shiomi Station, Shin-kiba Station
 JR Freight
 Etchūjima Branch Line: Etchūjima Freight Terminal
 Tokyo Metro
 Tōzai Line: Monzen-nakachō Station, Kiba Station, Tōyōchō Station, Minami-sunamachi Station
 Yūrakuchō Line: Toyosu Station, Tatsumi Station, Shin-kiba Station
 Hanzōmon Line: Sumiyoshi Station, Kiyosumi-shirakawa Station
 Tokyo Metropolitan Bureau of Transportation
 Toei Shinjuku Line: Morishita Station, Sumiyoshi Station, Nishi-Ōjima Station, Ōjima Station, Higashi-Ōjima Station
 Toei Ōedo Line: Morishita Station, Kiyosumi-shirakawa Station, Monzen-nakachō Station
 Tobu Railway
 Kameido Line: Kameido Station, Kameido-suijin Station
 Tokyo Waterfront Area Rapid Transit
 Rinkai Line: Shin-kiba Station, Shinonome Station, Kokusai-tenjijō Station, Tokyo Teleport Station
 Yurikamome
 Yurikamome: Tokyo International Cruise Terminal Station, Telecom Center Station, Aomi Station, Tokyo Big Sight Station, Ariake Station, Ariake-Tennis-no-mori Station, Shijō-mae Station, Shin-toyosu Station, Toyosu Station

Highway 
Shuto Expressway
C2 Central Loop (Itabashi JCT – Kasai JCT)
No.7 Komatsugawa Route (Ryogoku JCT – Yagochi)
No.9 Fukagawa Route (Hakozaki JCT – Tatsumi JCT)
B Bayshore Route (Kawasaki-ukishima JCT – Koya)

Air 
 Tokyo Heliport, in Shin-Kiba

Economy
Companies with headquarters in Koto include Daimaru Matsuzakaya Department Stores, Ibex Airlines, Fujikura, and Maruha Nichiro.

Sony operates the Ariake Business Center in Kōtō. The broadcasting center of WOWOW is in Koto.

Seta Corporation was headquartered in Kōtō.

Government

The main city office for Kōtō City is located in Toyo. There are branch offices located in Shirakawa, Tomioka, Toyosu, Komatsubashi, Kameido, Ojima, Sunamachi and Minamisuna.

Notable places
AgeHa nightclub
Kameido Tenjin Shrine
Tomioka Hachiman Shrine
Fukagawa Edo Museum
Fukagawa Fudo-son
Kiyosumi Garden
Museum of Contemporary Art Tokyo in Kiba Park
Tokyo Big Sight (Tokyo International Exhibition Center)
Ariake Coliseum, site of Japan Open Tennis Championships, All Japan Tennis Championships
Ariake Tennis Forest Park, which has Ariake Coliseum and 48 tennis courts
Suzaki Baseball Field, site of Japanese Baseball League games in 1930s
Kiba Metropolitan Park
Yumenoshima Tropical Greenhouse Dome
Shin-Kiba 1st Ring
Tokyo Gate Bridge
Dream Bridge

Education

Colleges and universities
Ariake Junior College of Education and the Arts (Ariake Kyōiku Geijutsu Tanki Dbigaku)
Tokyo University of Marine Science and Technology (Tokyo Kaiyo Daigaku, part of the national university system)
Shibaura Institute of Technology (Shibaura Kougyō Daigaku)
Shurin College of Foreign Language (Shurin Gaigo Senmon Gakkou, a private 2 year college for language)

Primary and secondary schools
Public high schools are operated by the Tokyo Metropolitan Government Board of Education.
 
 
 
 
 
 
 
 

Public elementary and middle schools are operated by the Koto City Board of Education.

Combined junior and senior high schools:
 Ariake Nishi Gakuen (有明西学園)

Junior high schools:
 No. 2 Kameido Junior High School (第二亀戸中学校)
 No. 2 Minamisuna Junior High School (第二南砂中学校)
 No. 2 Ojima Junior High School (第二大島中学校)
 No. 2 Sunamachi Junior High School (第二砂町中学校)
 No. 3 Kameido Junior High School (第三亀戸中学校)
 No. 3 Sunamachi Junior High School (第三砂町中学校)
 No. 4 Sunamachi Junior High School (第四砂町中学校)
 Ariake Junior High School (有明中学校)
 Fukagawa No. 1 Junior High School (深川第一中学校)
 Fukagawa No. 2 Junior High School (深川第二中学校)
 Fukagawa No. 3 Junior High School (深川第三中学校)
 Fukagawa No. 4 Junior High School (深川第四中学校)
 Fukagawa No. 5 Junior High School (深川第五中学校)
 Fukagawa No. 6 Junior High School (深川第六中学校)
 Fukagawa No. 7 Junior High School (深川第七中学校)
 Fukagawa No. 8 Junior High School (深川第八中学校)
 Kameido Junior High School (亀戸中学校)
 Ojima Junior High School (大島中学校)
 Ojima Nishi Junior High School (大島西中学校)
 Minamisuna Junior High School (南砂中学校)
 Sunamachi Junior High School (砂町中学校)
 Tatsumi Junior High School (辰巳中学校)
 Toyo Junior High School (東陽中学校)

Elementary schools:
 No. 1 Kameido Elementary School (第一亀戸小学校)
 No. 1 Ojima Elementary School (第一大島小学校)
 No. 2 Kameido Elementary School (第二亀戸小学校)
 No. 2 Ojima Elementary School (第二大島小学校)
 No. 2 Sunamachi Elementary School (第二砂町小学校)
 No. 2 Tatsumi Elementary School (第二辰巳小学校)
 No. 3 Ojima Elementary School (第三大島小学校)
 No. 3 Sunamachi Elementary School (第三砂町小学校)
 No. 4 Ojima Elementary School (第四大島小学校)
 No. 4 Sunamachi Elementary School (第四砂町小学校)
 No. 5 Ojima Elementary School (第五大島小学校)
 No. 5 Sunamachi Elementary School (第五砂町小学校)
 No. 6 Sunamachi Elementary School (第六砂町小学校)
 No. 7 Sunamachi Elementary School (第七砂町小学校)
 Ariake Elementary School (有明小学校)
 Edagawa Elementary School (枝川小学校)
 Etchujima Elementary School (越中島小学校)
 Fukagawa Elementary School (深川小学校)
 Heikyu Elementary School (平久小学校)
 Higashisuna Elementary School (東砂小学校)
 Kametaka Elementary School (亀高小学校)
 Katori Elementary School (香取小学校)
 Kazuya Elementary School (数矢小学校)
 Kitasuna Elementary School (北砂小学校)
 Meiji Elementary School (明治小学校)
 Minamisuna Elementary School (南砂小学校)
 Mori Elementary School (毛利小学校)
 Motogaka Elementary School (元加賀小学校)
 Nanyo Elementary School (南陽小学校)
 Ogibashi Elementary School (扇橋小学校)
 Ojima Nan'o Elementary School (大島南央小学校)
 Onagigawa Elementary School (小名木川小学校)
 Rinkai Elementary School (臨海小学校)
 Sengen Tatekawa Elementary School (浅間竪川小学校)
 Sennan Elementary School (川南小学校)
 Shinonome Elementary School (東雲小学校)
 Suijin Elementary School (水神小学校)
 Sunamachi Elementary School (砂町小学校)
 Tatsumi Elementary School (辰巳小学校)
 Tosen Elementary School (東川小学校)
 Toyo Elementary School (東陽小学校)
 Toyosu Elementary School (豊洲小学校)
 Toyosu Kita Elementary School (豊洲北小学校)
 Toyosu Nishi Elementary School (豊洲西小学校)
 Yanagawa Elementary School (八名川小学校)

Private schools:

International schools
International schools are independently owned and operated.
 K. International School Tokyo
 India International School in Japan
  – North Korean school

International relations
As of April 20, 1989, Kōtō became the Sister City of Surrey, British Columbia, Canada.

Notable people from Kōtō
 Yuto Horigome, Japanese skateboarder, 2020 Olympic gold medalist
 Shōta Sometani, Japanese actor
 Takaaki Yamazaki, Japanese politician and the current mayor of Kōtō
 Kazuto Sakata, Japanese former professional motorcycle racer and two-time F.I.M. 125cc world champion
 Anne Nakamura (Real Name: Yuko Nakamura, Nihongo: 中村 友子, Nakamura Yūko), Japanese model, tarento and actress
 Daisuke Gōri, Japanese actor, voice actor and narrator
 Genki Sudo, Japanese politician, former entertainer and kickboxer
 Ben Kimura, Japanese politician
 Hana Kimura, Japanese professional wrestler, died in Kōtō
 Hiroshi Yamamoto, Japanese professional shogi player ranked 4-dan
 Tomomi Kahara (Real Name: Tomomi Shimogawara, Nihongo: 下河原 朋美, Shimogawara Tomomi), Japanese pop singer
 Akihito Hirose, Japanese professional shogi player ranked 8-dan
 Hiromu Watanabe, Japanese professional shogi player ranked 5-dan
 Yasuko Kobayashi, Japanese anime and tokusatsu drama screenwriter 
 Yōhei Kajiyama, Japanese former football player
 Yugo Iiyama, Japanese football player (Iwate Grulla Morioka, J3 League)
 Tetsuo Kurata (Real Name: Tetsuo Kakimoto, Nihongo: 柿本 哲夫, Kakimoto Tetsuo) Japanese television, stage, film actor and restaurateur (Kamen Rider Black and Kamen Rider Black RX)
 Tomokazu Seki, Japanese actor, Seiyū and singer of Fushigi Yūgi, Weiss Kruez, You're Under Arrest,  Initial D,  Mobile Suite Gundam Seed & Mobile Suite Gundam Seed DESTINY.

References

External links

Kōtō City Official Website 

 
Wards of Tokyo